Father of a Soldier ( translit. jariskats'is mama) is a 1964 Georgian black-and-white World War II-themed drama film directed by Revaz Chkheidze based on a script by Suliko Jgenti. The leading role was played by Sergo Zakariadze. The film was entered into the 4th Moscow International Film Festival.

Plot
Summer of 1942. The elderly Georgian farmer Giorgi Makharashvili learns that his son, Goderdzi, is wounded and was taken to a hospital. Giorgi is setting forth to visit his son. While he was getting there, the son had recovered and sent off to the front.

Giorgi decides to stay in the army and successfully gets enlisted to the motorized units. Together with his comrades in arms, he goes to Germany. He finds his son's tank brigade was the first to cross the river. There is a fight in a building between the Soviets on ground level, and Germans on the second level, as the Soviets try to liberate the blockaded soldiers on the third level.

Giorgi hears his son, and tries to save him. Goderdzi is fatally wounded, and is held by his father. The film ends with Giorgi and his comrades crossing the bridge, inscribed in paint "Here, first crossed the tanks of Hero of the Soviet Union Senior Lieutenant Makharashvilli"

Cast
 Sergo Zaqariadze as Giorgi Makharashvili
 Vladimir Privaltsev as Nikiforov  
 Aleksandr Nazarov as Arkadi 
 Aleksandr Lebedev  as Nikolay Nazarov
 Yuri Drozdov as Vova  
 Vladimir Kolokoltsev  as Grisha  
 Viktor Uralsky as Pasha 
 Qetevan Bochorishvili as Tamari, Giorgi's wife    
 Vladimir Pitsek as hospital registrar
 Pyotr Lyubeshkin as general
 Ivan Kosykh as Akhmed 
 Viktor Kosykh as Vasya
  Roman Vildan   as musician
  Yura Drozdov as Borya
 Yelena Maksimova as  Borya's granny
 Inna Vykhodtseva  as Vasya's mother
 Nikolai Barmin as colonel
 Radner Muratov   as lieutenant
 Bondo Goginava  as Giorgi Makharashvili's fellow villager  
 Ketevan Bochorishvili  as Maria
 Gia Kobakhidze as Goderdzi Makharashvili

References

External links
 

Georgian-language films
1964 films
1964 drama films
Soviet black-and-white films
Kartuli Pilmi films
Soviet World War II films
Films directed by Revaz Chkheidze
Drama films from Georgia (country)
Multilingual films from Georgia (country)
Soviet war drama films
Black-and-white films from Georgia (country)
Films set in 1942
Films about Nazi Germany
World War II films from Georgia (country)